Paul Sinibaldi (3 December 1921 – 2 April 2018) was a French professional footballer who played as a goalkeeper.

Early and personal life
Born in Montemaggiore, Corsica, Sinibaldi's two brothers Pierre and Noël were also footballers.

Sinibaldi was a mentor to Raymond Kopa and was godfather to his son.

Career
Sinibaldi played club football for Toulouse, Nîmes, Olympique Alès, Reims and Stade Français. With Reims he won the championship three times and the Coupe de France once.

He earned one international cap for France in 1950. At the time of his death he was the oldest living former French international.

Later life and death
He died in Marseille on 2 April 2018, at the age of 96.

References

1921 births
2018 deaths
French footballers
Association football goalkeepers
France international footballers
Toulouse FC players
Nîmes Olympique players
Olympique Alès players
Stade de Reims players
Stade Français (association football) players
Ligue 2 players
Ligue 1 players
Sportspeople from Haute-Corse
Footballers from Corsica